Hush puppies may refer to:

 Hushpuppy, a southern U.S. food
 Hush Puppies, a footwear brand
 HushPuppies, a musical group
 Basset Hound, the dog breed used in advertising for Hush Puppies footwear
 A version of the Smith & Wesson Model 39 firearm equipped with a suppressor and used by commandos in Vietnam to kill sentries during raids
 Hush Puppy, a character in the children's series Lamb Chop's Play-Along

See also
 Slush Puppie
 Hushpuppi, one of several aliases of Ramon Abbas (born 1982), Nigerian fraudster and money launderer